Tiffany Boone (born August 27, 1987) is an American actress, best known for her roles as Roxy Jones in Hunters, Mandy Lang in the second season of the FOX TV series The Following and for her supporting roles as Savannah Snow and Mimi in the fantasy film Beautiful Creatures and the horror-comedy film Detention, respectively.

Early life
Boone was raised by her mother in Baltimore, Maryland. Her mother works for the Social Security Administration. Her father was murdered in 1991, when she was three. In 2009, Boone graduated from California Institute of the Arts.

Filmography

Film

Television

References

External links
 
 

1987 births
Living people
Actresses from Baltimore
California Institute of the Arts alumni
American film actresses
American television actresses
African-American actresses
21st-century American actresses
21st-century African-American women
21st-century African-American people
20th-century African-American people
20th-century African-American women